Natisha Hiedeman (born February 10, 1997) is an American professional basketball player for the Connecticut Sun of the Women's National Basketball Association (WNBA). She was drafted with the eighteenth overall pick in the 2019 WNBA Draft, which is the highest of any Marquette basketball player in school history and the highest draft pick for the Big East Conference since conference re-alignment.

Early life
Shortly after her birth, Hiedeman had to wear a full-body harness due to a hyperextension in her left leg. Her mother had her at 19. As a child, Hiedeman also played baseball and was the only girl on her team.

Hiedeman attended Green Bay Southwest High School, where she had the nickname "T-Spoon" after former WNBA star Teresa Weatherspoon. She holds school records in triple jump, high jump, long jump, and 100 meter hurdles.

College career
Hiedeman was recruited to Marquette after being the leading scorer in the Green Bay Metro area in high school while attending Green Bay Southwest High School. Hiedeman's brother is Maccabi Tel Aviv B.C. player Sandy Cohen, who also played at Marquette. In her first year at Marquette, she was named to the Big East All-Freshman Team. In the 2017–18 season, she was named to the Meyers Drysdale Award Watch List.  Hiedeman finished her career as Marquette's third all-time leading scorer, just 27 points shy of the program record. Additionally, she was the first Marquette player to reach 300 made three-pointers and finished sixth on Marquette's all-time assist chart.

Marquette statistics

Source

WNBA career
Hiedeman was drafted 18th overall in the 2019 WNBA Draft by the Minnesota Lynx. During the draft, her rights were traded to the Connecticut Sun in exchange for Lexie Brown.  She was eventually waived by the Sun. On June 19, 2019, the Atlanta Dream signed Hiedeman as a EuroBasket replacement for Alex Bentley. Hiedeman did not make an appearance for the Dream before Bentley returned to the team.  Upon Bentley's return, Hiedeman was waived.

Hiedeman was resigned by the Sun after her exit from Atlanta.  She appeared in her first WNBA game with the Sun. On July 10, she scored her first WNBA points.

In 2020, Hiedeman was signed by the Israeli Female Basketball Premier League champions Maccabi Ironi Ramat Gan.

WNBA career statistics

Regular season

|-
| style="text-align:left;"| 2019
| style="text-align:left;"| Connecticut
| 20 || 0 || 10.3 || .414 || .464 || .500 || 1.5 || 1.9 || 0.4 || 0.1 || 0.7 || 3.7
|-
| style="text-align:left;"| 2020
| style="text-align:left;"| Connecticut
| 22 || 4 || 18.5 || .354 || .359 || .700 || 1.9 || 1.9 || 0.4 || 0.0 || 1.1 || 6.1
|-
| style="text-align:left;"| 2021
| style="text-align:left;"| Connecticut
| 32 || 5 || 20.1 || .400 || .398 || .700 || 1.9 || 1.9 || 0.8 || 0.2 || 0.9 || 7.6
|-
| style="text-align:left;"| 2022
| style="text-align:left;"| Connecticut
| 36 || 31 || 25.0 || .431 || .411 || .800 || 1.8 || 3.3 || 1.2 || 0.1 || 1.3 || 9.1
|- 
| style="text-align:left;"| Career
| style="text-align:left;"| 4 years, 1 team
| 110 || 40 || 19.6 || .405 || .402 || .687 || 1.8 || 2.3 || 0.8 || 0.1 || 1.0 || 7.1
|}

Postseason

|-
| style="text-align:left;"| 2019
| style="text-align:left;"| Connecticut
| 7 || 0 || 5.0 || .600 || .667 || 1.000 || 0.6 || 0.7 || 0.0 || 0.0 || 0.0 || 2.6
|-
| style="text-align:left;"| 2020
| style="text-align:left;"| Connecticut
| 7 || 0 || 7.7 || .538 || .625 || .833 || 0.7 || 1.3 || 0.3 || 0.1 || 0.6 || 3.4
|-
| style="text-align:left;"| 2021
| style="text-align:left;"| Connecticut
| 4 || 0 || 18.0 || .500 || .600 || .714 || 0.8 || 3.0 || 0.8 || 0.5 || 9.0
|-
| style="text-align:left;"| 2022
| style="text-align:left;"| Connecticut
| 12 || 12 || 26.2 || .419 || .444 || .769 || 2.1 || 3.0 || 0.7 || 0.3 || 1.0 || 8.2
|- 
| style="text-align:left;"| Career
| style="text-align:left;"| 4 years, 1 team
| 30 || 12 || 15.8 || .458 || .523 || .786 || 1.2 || 2.1 || 0.4 || 0.2 || 0.6 || 5.9
|}

Personal life
In September 2021, Hiedeman announced her engagement to Connecticut Sun teammate Jasmine Thomas.

References

External links
Marquette Golden Eagles bio
WNBA bio

1997 births
Living people
American women's basketball players
Basketball players from Wisconsin
Connecticut Sun players
LGBT basketball players
LGBT people from Wisconsin
Lesbian sportswomen
Marquette Golden Eagles women's basketball players
Minnesota Lynx draft picks
Shooting guards
Sportspeople from Green Bay, Wisconsin